The following is a list of Bulgarian film directors.

Bulgarian
Film directors